Utogrund is a football stadium in Zurich, Switzerland. It is the home ground for SC YF Juventus and has a capacity of 2,800.

References 
https://www.thefinalball.com/estadio.php?id=3105

Sports venues in Zürich